Mahpara Safdar (born 15 November 1954) is a Pakistani journalist, column writer, and former newscaster at PTV, Radio Pakistan, and BBC Urdu.

Early life and education
Mahpara was born on November 15, 1954, in Lahore. Her father Syed Hassan Abbas Zaidi was a poet and was associated with the education department. Mahpara was the fourth of six sisters. She came to Sargodha with her parents as a child and received her primary, high school, and college education from Sargodha. She earned her master's degree in English from the University of the Punjab, Lahore. Meanwhile, she also participated in university programs on Radio Pakistan. Later in her career, she did MA in women's studies from the University of London.

Career
Mahpara joined Pakistan Television Lahore as a newscaster in 1975. She remained associated with PTV till 1990. In January 1990, she went abroad with her family and joined BBC Urdu Service in London, where she worked as a newscaster till 2014. She did several broadcasting courses at the BBC.

According to a Gallup survey conducted in 1986, she was the most popular female PTV newscaster.

She has also been working as the editor for current affairs in the Aalami Akhbar since November 2006.

Personal life
In August 1979, Mahpara marrried poet and radio producer Safdar Hamdani.

News presentations

Books
 Mera Zamana Meri Kahani (Autobiography), published by Book Corner, Jehlam, in 2022,

Awards

References

External links
 
 

1954 births
Living people
Pakistani women journalists
Pakistani television newsreaders and news presenters
People from Lahore
Nigar Award winners
Pakistani women radio presenters
PTV Award winners
Pakistan Television Corporation people